Anthony William Landon Asquith (9 November 1902 – 20 February 1968) was an English film director. He collaborated successfully with playwright Terence Rattigan on The Winslow Boy (1948) and The Browning Version (1951), among other adaptations. His other notable films include Pygmalion (1938), French Without Tears (1940), The Way to the Stars (1945) and a 1952 adaptation of Oscar Wilde's The Importance of Being Earnest.

Life and career
Born in London, he was the son of H. H. Asquith, the Prime Minister from 1908 to 1916, and Margot Asquith, who was responsible for 'Puffin' as his family nickname. He was educated at Eaton House, Winchester College and Balliol College, Oxford.

The film industry was viewed as disreputable when Asquith was young, and according to the actor Jonathan Cecil, a family friend, Asquith entered this profession in order to escape his background. At the end of the 1920s, he began his career with the direction of four silent films, the last of which, A Cottage on Dartmoor, established his reputation with its meticulous and often emotionally moving frame composition. Pygmalion (1938) was based on the George Bernard Shaw play featuring Leslie Howard and Wendy Hiller.

Asquith was a longtime friend and colleague of Terence Rattigan (they collaborated on ten films) and producer Anatole de Grunwald. His later films included Rattigan's The Winslow Boy (1948) and The Browning Version (1951), and Oscar Wilde's The Importance of Being Earnest (1952).

Asquith was an alcoholic and, according to actor Jonathan Cecil, a repressed homosexual. He died in 1968. He was buried at All Saints Churchyard, Sutton Courtenay, Berkshire, England.

Filmography

Feature films

Shooting Stars (1927)
Underground (1928)
The Runaway Princess (1929)
A Cottage on Dartmoor (1929)
Tell England (1931)
Dance Pretty Lady (1932)
The Lucky Number (1933)
Letting in the Sunshine (1933)
Unfinished Symphony (1934)
Moscow Nights (1935)
Pygmalion (1938)
French Without Tears (1940)
Freedom Radio (1941)
Quiet Wedding (1941)
Cottage to Let (1941)
Uncensored (1942)
We Dive at Dawn (1943)
The Demi-Paradise (1943)
Fanny by Gaslight (1944)
The Way to the Stars (1945)
While the Sun Shines (1947)
The Winslow Boy (1948)
The Woman in Question (1950)
The Browning Version (1951)
The Importance of Being Earnest (1952)
The Final Test (1953)
The Net (1953)
The Young Lovers (1954)
Carrington V.C. (1955)
On Such a Night (1955)
Orders to Kill (1958)
The Doctor's Dilemma (1958)
Libel (1959)
The Millionairess (1960)
Two Living, One Dead (1961)
Guns of Darkness (1962)
The V.I.P.s (1963)
The Yellow Rolls-Royce (1965)

Short films

The Story of Papworth (1935)
Channel Incident (1940)
Rush Hour (1941)
Two Fathers (1944)

References

External links

1902 births
1968 deaths
English people of Scottish descent
People educated at Gibbs School
People educated at Summer Fields School
People educated at Winchester College
Alumni of Balliol College, Oxford
Children of prime ministers of the United Kingdom
Younger sons of earls
Film directors from London
LGBT film directors
Deaths from cancer in England
Deaths from lymphoma
Asquith family
Tennant family
English gay men
20th-century English LGBT people
Children of H. H. Asquith